The Rocca Malvezzi-Campeggi, also known as the Rocca Sforzesca di Dozza, or just Rocca di Dozza, is a medieval castle in the town of Dozza, in the region of Emilia Romagna, Italy.

The general layout of present structure was likely built in the 13th century atop more ancient foundations. However, it was reconstructed many times through war.

The main outline we see in 2020 dates from the end of the 15th century, when Caterina Sforza, daughter of the Duke of Milan and wife of Girolamo Riario, commissioned refurbishment from the architect Giorgio Marchesi. Riario was the grandson of Pope Sixtus IV. Marchesi, with the help of some of the military engineers working for the Sforza, helped design the defensive towers, moat, and merlons.

In the 1500s, the castle was granted by Pope Clement VII to the Cardinal Lorenzo Campeggi. He converted the castle into a residence, roofing the courtyard and creating open loggias. In 1728, the passing of Lorenzo Campeggi, the last male heir of the Campeggi, the castle passed to the Francesca Maria Capeggi, married to Matteo Malvezzi. Their son, carried forth the name of Malvezzi-Campeggi. In 1798, the Napoleonic occupation of the region abolished the feudal domains, but the castle remained in the hands of the family until 1960.

In 1960, the castle-palace was acquired by the Commune. The main hall still has portraits of Malvezzi and tapestries with the family coat of arms. The castle still has a portrait of the Campeggi family by Lorenzo Pasinelli.

The castle is now used by the commune for exhibitions, including their collection donated by Norma Mascellani and some of the artists who have participated in the town's biennial festival of the Muro Dipinto. The cellars sponsor a regional Enoteca for Emilia-Romagna.

References

Castles in Emilia-Romagna